Qu River is a river of in China's Sichuan Province and Chongqing Municipality. It is a left tributary of the Jialing River, which in its turn is a left tributary of the Yangtze; it is thus part of the East China Sea basin. Its length is 720 km.

See also
List of rivers in China

Rivers of Sichuan
Rivers of Chongqing
Tributaries of the Yangtze River